Saperda octopunctata is a species of beetle in the family Cerambycidae, and the type species of its genus. It was described by Scopoli in 1772, originally under the genus Leptura. It has a wide distribution in Europe. It feeds on Populus tremula.

References

octopunctata
Beetles described in 1772
Taxa named by Giovanni Antonio Scopoli